Handale is a hamlet, that is  south of Loftus, in the borough of Redcar and Cleveland and the ceremonial county of North Yorkshire, England.

Handale was once the site of a Cistercian nunnery, founded in 1133.

There is a legend that the woods in the area were once the haunt of a dragon known as the Handale Serpent. It is said that the dragon was slain by a man named Scaw, after whom Scaw Wood is named.

See also
Handale Priory

References

External links

Hamlets in North Yorkshire
Places in the Tees Valley
Loftus, North Yorkshire